Ricardo Alexandre Ribeiro Vieira (born 31 July 1997), known as Robinho, is a Portuguese professional footballer who plays for F.C. Penafiel as an attacking midfielder.

Club career

Belenenses SAD
Robinho was born in Lisbon. He started his senior career in amateur football, first with Sporting Clube Linda-a-Velha then SG Sacavenense.

In the summer of 2018, Robinho moved to the Primeira Liga after signing with Belenenses SAD. In his first season, he played only with the under-23 team. 

Robinho's debut in the Portuguese top division took place on 15 September 2019, when he came on as a late substitute in a 3–1 away win against C.S. Marítimo. He finished the campaign with 15 appearances and one goal across all competitions, being sent off in the 7–1 league loss at S.C. Braga for dissent.

Penafiel
On 12 January 2021, Robinho was loaned to Liga Portugal 2 club F.C. Penafiel until 30 June. In June, he agreed to a permanent two-year contract.

References

External links

1997 births
Living people
Portuguese footballers
Footballers from Lisbon
Association football midfielders
Primeira Liga players
Liga Portugal 2 players
Campeonato de Portugal (league) players
Belenenses SAD players
F.C. Penafiel players